Rohan Raje (born 3 September 1986) is an Indian cricketer who currently represents Mumbai. He also represented the Mumbai Indians in the Indian Premier League from 2008 to 2009.

References

1986 births
Living people
Mumbai cricketers
West Zone cricketers
Mumbai Indians cricketers
Indian cricketers